The 1882 Southern Rugby Union season was the ninth season of the Sydney Rugby Premiership. Several clubs competed from May till August 1882. The season culminated in intercolonial matches against a touring Queensland team, and a tour to New Zealand by a team representing the Union.

Teams 
By the beginning of the season, the Southern Rugby Football Union had 35 clubs signed up as part of the Union. The SRFU annual report for 1882, presented at the SRFU annual general meeting in April 1883, mentioned that 12 new clubs had registered with the Union.

Representative Games

Intercolonial Matches 

Note: Under the rules then in place for determining the winner, the result was four goals and four tries to one goal. New South Wales' four goals comprised the two converted tries (or touch-downs) and the two drop-goals. The additional four tries were the unsuccessful conversion goal kicks for four out of the six touch-downs. Queensland failed with a penalty place kick at goal, but were successful with a drop goal.

Following their win over the Wallaroo Club on Saturday, 19 August, the Queensland team requested the opportunity to again meet a combined New South Wales side, in a return match.   After consultation with the shipping company on which the Queensland team were booked to depart Sydney, arrangements were made to kick-off this second intercolonial game at 2.30pm, Tuesday, and convey the team to the steamer shortly after the game concluded.

Note: The combined New South Wales team secured six touch-downs, with two of the attempts at goal being successful, and four missed tries. A feature of the game at the time is that when a kick at goal was missed, the defending team (in this case Queensland) would have options to either run the ball into general play or touch-down in their own in-goal to obtain relief.

Other Matches on the Queensland tour 

Note: Under the rules then in place for determining the winner, the result was a win to University by one goal and four tries to Queensland's one try. Queensland were the first to touch-down, through Townsend, but their conversion attempt, and an earlier penalty kick for goal were missed by Pritchard. Queensland led at half-time by one try to nil. University touched-down five times in the second stanza, with the only successful kick being made by Flynn following his own touch-down.

Note: Under the rules then in place for determining the winner, the result was a win to Queensland by one goal to one try. Queensland touched-down to earn their kick at goal, which was successful. The County of Cumberland team failed with their kick at goal following their one touch-down, or try.

Note: Queensland beat the Wallroo club by a margin of one goal and one try to nil. For Queensland, Pritchard missed the kick following the touch-down by Feez, but was successful with the kick following a touch-down by Townson.

New South Wales Tour of New Zealand 

The Southern Rugby Football Union arranged for a New South Wales team to tour New Zealand, with the support of rugby union associations an the host venues. E. Raper  from the University club was appointed captain and manager, with R. Thallon, of Balmain club, as secretary. The team departed Sydney on August 30, 1882.

The team comprised the following 16 players.

Other Football Codes 
Match reports and other relevant articles in 1882 newspapers generally did not make an immediately obvious distinction between football codes. Several clubs played Australian Rules Football under the auspices, and in affiliation with, the New South Wales Football Association. In many instances, the code being reported on in newspapers could be determined by tries and touch-downs  in Rugby Union and behinds in Australian Rules.

Australian Rules Football 
The following New South Wales clubs played Australian rules football in the 1882 season.

The New South Wales Football Association made arrangements for Victorian clubs Carlton and Hotham, to visit and play matches at the Association Ground in June. This proposed tour did not eventuate.

The Geelong Football Club did visit Sydney playing three of the clubs, a combined team, and Albury.

Soccer 
The following New South Wales clubs played English Association Football (soccer) in the 1882 season.

References 

1882 in Australian sport
1882 in rugby union
Rugby union competitions in New South Wales